General Gorchakov may refer to:

Aleksey Gorchakov (1769–1817), Imperial Russian Army general
Andrei Ivanovich Gorchakov (1768–1855), Imperial Russian Army lieutenant general
Mikhail Dmitrievich Gorchakov (1793–1861), Imperial Russian Army general of the artillery
Pyotr Gorchakov (1790–1868), Imperial Russian Army general